Ignacio Jesús Aguado Crespo (born 23 February 1983) is a Spanish lawyer and politician from Citizens (Cs), serving as the party's spokesman in the Assembly of Madrid and as Vice President, Cabinet Minister of Sports and Transparency and Spokesperson of the Government of the Community of Madrid between 2019 and 2021.

References

External links
Ignacio Aguado Facebook Official fanpage

1983 births
Living people
Citizens (Spanish political party) politicians
People from Madrid
Members of the 10th Assembly of Madrid
Members of the Citizens Parliamentary Group (Assembly of Madrid)
Members of the 11th Assembly of Madrid